Pig Lib is the second studio album by Stephen Malkmus and the Jicks, released on March 18, 2003 by Matador Records. It peaked at #97 in the U.S. and #63 in the UK. The first pressing of the record came with a bonus disc containing five additional new songs. As of June 2004, the album has sold 49,000 copies in the U.S. according to Nielsen SoundScan.

Critical reception 

Pig Lib received generally positive reviews from music critics. Christian Hoard, writing for Rolling Stone, described the album as "Malkmus' loosest set of songs ever, an elegantly meandering head trip underpinned by the kind of tuneful, world-wise romanticism that's won him the hearts of English majors everywhere".

Track listing 
 "Water and a Seat" – 4:18
 "Ramp of Death" – 2:37
 "(Do Not Feed the) Oyster" – 4:49
 "Vanessa from Queens" – 3:21
 "Sheets" – 3:19
 "Animal Midnight" – 5:11
 "Dark Wave" – 2:26
 "Witch Mountain Bridge" – 5:21
 "Craw Song" – 2:41
 "1% of One" – 9:11
 "Us" – 4:16

Bonus disc 
 "Dynamic Calories" – 2:23
 "Fractions & Feelings" – 3:28
 "Old Jerry" – 6:18
 "The Poet and the Witch" (live) – 2:05
 "Shake It Around" (live) – 4:04

"The Poet and The Witch" is a Mellow Candle cover.

"Shake It Around" is an otherwise unreleased original.

References

External links 

2003 albums
Matador Records albums
Stephen Malkmus albums
Albums recorded at Bear Creek Studio